Blood: Water Mission is a grassroots organization founded by Jars of Clay and Jena Lee Nardella that works against the HIV/AIDS and water crises in Africa.

History
Blood:Water Mission began as a call to personalize the HIV/AIDS crisis in Africa by telling the stories of individual Africans.

The organization launched the 1000 Wells Project in 2005 as a nationwide effort to raise enough money to provide clean water and sanitation to 1000 communities in sub-Saharan Africa based on the equation that $1 provides one African with clean water for an entire year.

Since its launch, Blood:Water Mission has raised millions of dollars from individuals seeking to make a difference. They have partnered with more than over 800 communities in Africa, providing life-saving water and health needs for over 500,000 people in 13 different countries. Along the way, the 1000 Wells Project has expanded to include a variety of clean water solutions, sanitation, hygiene training, as well as funding health clinics, community health workers, and support groups, which help in the prevention, treatment, care, and support of communities affected by AIDS, incorporating HIV/AIDS-specific programming alongside ongoing water programming. One such example is a clinic in Lwala, Kenya, which is now independently operated and community-led.

Projects and Campaigns

1000 Wells Project

The 1000 Wells Project is Blood:Water Mission's main project, which has a goal of providing 1,000 communities in Africa with safe drinking water.

Jars of Clay and other artists (Sara Groves, Christopher Williams, Derek Webb, Forever the Sickest Kids, Sixpence None the Richer, Hanson (band), Brandon Heath, Matthew Perryman Jones, Relient K, and many others) as well as authors (Jena Lee Nardella, Donald Miller and Anne Jackson) have been raising funds for the 1000 Wells Project during their concerts since 2005. The organization completed their goal of 1,000 wells in late 2010.

With the September 2006 release of their album, Good Monsters, Jars of Clay partnered with The Global Water Challenge and the Coca Cola Company to donate $1.00 toward the provision of clean water in Africa for each of the first 100,000 copies of Good Monsters sold.

US Campaigns

Blood:Water Mission's core purpose is to build community through creative social action.

40 Days of Water
Related to Christian observance of Lent, volunteers raise money while refraining from drinking beverages other than water for 40 Days. Money raised helps build clean water projects for communities in Uganda. Another campaign, Two weeks of Sacrifice takes place over only 2 weeks versus 6.

Water Walks
A group of volunteers raise money for water and sanitation projects for underdeveloped regions in Africa, where young people must travel to natural water sources every day. A water walk can be a very literal and impactful way to "walk a mile in someone else's shoes."

Back to School
The cost of not having access to clean water is higher than just the loss of health, one of the losses of opportunity is education. Blood:Water Mission's "Back to School Campaign" encourages people to help provide the funds necessary to ensure that a child does not have to walk miles to collect water each day, but can instead spend that time in the classroom.

Ride Well Tour
The Ride:Well Tour, powered by Venture Expeditions, is a cross-country cycling campaign to raise money and awareness for clean water & HIV/AIDS support in Africa through the work of Blood:Water Mission.

In the past two years, the Ride:Well Tour has raised close to $300,000 to provide clean water projects, clinics and educational opportunities for people in Africa while educating people in countless communities across America about the water & HIV/AIDS crises many Africans face every day.

This year they will be cycling across the southern half of the United States and north along the Pacific Coast to provide people in Marsabit, Kenya with clean drinking water, hygiene & sanitation education and latrines.

References

External links
 
How Blood:Water Works Video

Development charities based in the United States
Water-related charities
Jars of Clay